Tuiṭha River is a river of Manipur, India. It joins the Imphal River to form the Manipur River.

The Tuiṭha flows through the village of Leisang, one of India's 574,000 villages.

References 

Rivers of Manipur
Rivers of India